Mawson is a single-member electoral district for the South Australian House of Assembly. It covers the entirety of Kangaroo Island, and parts of the local government areas of Alexandrina Council, the City of Onkaparinga, and the District Council of Yankalilla. Major localities in the district include Cape Jervis, Kingscote, McLaren Vale, Port Willunga, Sellicks Beach, Willunga and Yankalilla.

The electorate was created in the 1969 redistribution, taking effect at the 1970 election. It is named after Sir Douglas Mawson, a geologist and explorer who made several expeditions to Antarctica. For the first three decades of its existence, it was a bellwether seat held by the party of government. This pattern was broken at the 2002 election, when Robert Brokenshire held the seat for the Liberals amidst a Labor election victory. Although it was thought that Brokenshire had established a base in Mawson, it reverted to form at the 2006 election, when Labor candidate and former journalist Leon Bignell won amid that year's massive Labor landslide. Bignell went on to increase his seat margins at the 2010 and 2014 elections. In both cases, he not only bucked the statewide trend, but also decades of voting patterns in the electorate. The 2016 redistribution ahead of the 2018 election heavily redistributed Mawson from a 5.6 percent Labor seat to a notional 3.2 percent Liberal seat, taking in areas down the coast as far as and including Kangaroo Island. However, Bignell picked up a swing of over four percent to narrowly retain the seat even as Labor lost government; he thus became its second opposition member.

Members for Mawson

Election results

Notes

References
 ECSA profile for Mawson: 2018
 ABC profile for Mawson: 2018
 Poll Bludger profile for Mawson: 2018

Electoral districts of South Australia
1970 establishments in Australia
Kangaroo Island